Norman Park is a recreation ground in Bromley, England.

It has a playground and athletics track, and hosts events such as a music festivals, weekly organised Parkruns and yearly car shows.

A 2 kilometre pathway circles the park making it popular with joggers, cyclists and dog-walkers.

The former park keeper's lodge is being converted by Mencap into an office and three business units that will teach people that fall under Mencap remit horticulture, bicycle repair and catering whilst also being viable businesses. The catering unit for example will take the form of a café which will meet a need of the park not covered by a permanent solution.

The park for the most part does not share its borders with any housing (instead bordered by farmland and Scrogginhall Wood), giving the park a sense of space and reducing risk that noise affects neighbours.

History 

The 1st edition OS Map of 1871 shows the site as farmland. The park is named after the Norman family whose estates once dominated Bromley; their name dates back to 1661. The land for Norman Park was acquired from A C Norman by Bromley Council in 1934 for £24,000 to provide land for leisure activities.

A stream called the Ravensbourne runs for 300 metres across the park. Whilst originally hidden underground in steel and concrete pipe (called a Culvert) in 2000 it was re-exposed (known as daylighting) and planting was put around it.

See also 
Images of the park can be seen on the site GeoGraph using the park's Ordnance Survey National Grid reference.

References 

Parks and open spaces in the London Borough of Bromley